Trump Tower Manila, also known as Trump Tower at Century City, is a residential building located in Makati, Metro Manila, Philippines. The Trump Tower Manila showroom opened in early 2012, although the company has said that unit reservations started in September 2011. Groundbreaking of the building began in June 2012, with a scheduled opening in November 2017. Construction was nearly finished as of November 2016. The $150 million tower stands 57 stories high on completion. The building is located at the Century City mixed-use complex in Makati Poblacion. It is the third tallest building in the Philippines and second tallest in the Makati skyline.

Century City Development Corp., a unit of Century Properties Group, developed the residential skyscraper with the brand name and mark under license from American real estate mogul and former President of the United States Donald Trump, Trump Marks Philippines LLC.

Design and architecture

Trump Tower Manila's concept of the 'peeled' façade is articulated with internal balconies; the top and bottom corners peel away to accentuate the form of the tower. The facade's function is environmentally responsive, with light shelves and shading systems designed to react to the building's orientation in relation to sun's path.

See also 
 List of tallest buildings in Metro Manila
 The Gramercy Residences
 List of things named after Donald Trump

References

Notes
Century Properties; Trump Tower at Century City (Philippines); www.trumptowerphilippines.com
Design Details; www.trumptowerphilippines.com: Architecture section; under license 2011.

Skyscrapers in Makati
Residential skyscrapers in Metro Manila
Residential buildings completed in 2017
21st-century architecture in the Philippines